Kanga Forest Reserve is a forest reserve in the Nguru Mountains of Tanzania.

References 

Eastern Arc forests
Eastern Arc Mountains
Forests of Tanzania
Protected areas established in 1954
1954 establishments in Tanganyika
Forest reserves of Tanzania